Gilbert Anselme Girouard (October 26, 1846 – January 13, 1885) was a general merchant and political figure in New Brunswick, Canada. He represented Kent in the House of Commons of Canada from 1878 to 1883 as a Liberal-Conservative member.

He was born in Ste-Marie de Buctouche, New Brunswick, and educated at St. Joseph's College in Memramcook. He taught school briefly in Sainte-Marie-de-Kent before becoming a general merchant in Buctouche in 1870. In 1872, he married Sophia Baker. Girouard resigned his seat in 1883 to accept the position of customs collector for Richibucto. He died of tuberculosis in Buctouche at the age of 38.

Electoral record

References 
 
 The Canadian parliamentary companion and annual register, 1879, CH Mackintosh 
 Biography at the Dictionary of Canadian Biography Online

1846 births
1885 deaths
St. Joseph's College alumni
Members of the House of Commons of Canada from New Brunswick
Conservative Party of Canada (1867–1942) MPs
Acadian people